There are a variety of traditional rural games in the historical region of Bengal (present-day Bangladesh and portions of eastern India). These games were usually played outside and with very limited resources collected from existing sources around their home. Many of them have similarities to other traditional South Asian games. Nowadays, with urbanization, many traditional games are being played less and less.

History 
Some traditional Bengali games are thousands of years old, and reference traditional ways of life; for example, it is argued that some of the rhymes that used to be associated with the gameplay of Gollachut, in which players run from the center of a circle towards a boundary area to be safe from opponents, may refer to escape attempts by slaves during the Indus Valley Civilisation or afterward.

Traditional games

Boli khela

Chungakhela 
Players attempt to throw firecrackers at each other, with burn injuries being risked.

Ekka-dokka 

One game, ekka-dokka,  often referred to as guti,  is typically played by females. It is known locally as guti (গুটি) and is played with a smaller, broken piece of an earthen pot. It could be flat clay that is rectangular or spherical. On the ground, a large box about three yards long is drawn, which is then divided into six smaller ones. There are other alternative formats, but they all have the same amount of boxes. Every box has a common name, such as EK-ER GHOR (এক এর ঘর) for the first box, DUI-ER GHOR (দুই এর ঘর) for the second box, and so on up to five boxes, but the last large semicircle is known as SAMUNDRA (সমুদ্র). There are some fixed spots in every box.
The players roll their guti into the first box as they stand in front of the starting line.
Then, this guti is rotated by the toes of one foot into the second, the second into the third, and so on up to the fifth box, at which point the player turns back toward their starting position in the same way but in a different direction. After taking one complete round, they once more roll the guti from the second box.
When rolling the guti, the player sings a melody called ekka-dokka.A player may be ruled out if their guti falls on the line, they choose the incorrect box, they leave their playing area, or places both of their feet inside the box.

Gaigodani 
One player throws a stick hard into a muddy surface so that it becomes lodged upright in the ground, and a second player attempts to throw their stick so that the first stick either falls to the ground, or ends up parallel to the second stick. If the second player fails, the first player may attempt the same, with the two alternating until one of them succeeds. The winner of the two retains both sticks and then challenges a third player in the same fashion, and so on. Once one player has all the sticks, they throw them all away and hide their own stick, with each opponent attempting to retrieve a thrown stick and touch the hidden stick. The last opponent to o is the loser.

Gulli danda 

Gulli danda, also known as danguli khela, is usually played among boys. It is played with a smaller piece of wooden called GULLI (about 4 inches) and a two feet stick called a danda.  Gulli is placed on a small pit (four inches, is dug into the ground) to pushes gulli off by using DANDA. The opposition player tries to catch the gulli. Second player gets the changes to push the gulli if the first player is out by catch gulli or hitting the danda. If the first player is not out, then he gets the change to hitting gulli. It is done by two steps, first he try to hitting one side of the gulli to slightly bouncing for placing it in air, then he tries to hit the gulli to send as far as distance from pit with Danda. Mainly 3 hits is given for the bouncing the gulli. Player have to send the guli in far distance just using the 3 hitting. If he missing 3 hits, player will be declared "out" and second player gets changes to push the gulli.  Again the opposition players try to catch this flying gulli for out the player. If the player is not out, he gets the points by measuring the distance between the pit and gulli (where gulli falls). Another interesting thing is that while the gulli is in the air, the player can also attempt to toss it a few times with the danda before finally hitting it away. It is called double (if two times hit) or triple (if three times hit).

Golap Tagar 
Also known as Phul Tokka, in this game the players are separated by an equal distance from a dividing boundary line. Players are alternately blindfolded and then asked to guess which player on the other team has touched them on the forehead; when players guess correctly, they are allowed to take a jump forward. When a player guesses incorrectly, however, the opponent that touched them on the forehead instead gets to take a leap forward. The first team to get a player over the dividing line wins.

Lathi khela

Nouka Baich

Openti Bioscope 
Two players form a "gate" by holding hands, and other players attempt to go through the gate before it is lowered (which usually occurs at the completion of a song sung by the two players).

Raja-chor-mantri-sipahi 

Raja-chor-mantri-sipahi is usually played among boys and girls. Usually four players are needed to play this game. Raja, mantri, chor and sipahi are written on four small chits of paper. Points are dedicated to these characters, usually Raja has 1000 points, mantra has 500 points, shipahi has 100 points and chaor has 0 points. After folding these chits are thrown in middle of the four players who then collect one each. The player who gets the Raja gives the order to mantri to find out who is chor from the remaining two players. Mantri gets points if he correctly finds chor, otherwise mantri's points will be zero and the points of mantri go to chor. Rounds continue this way and points are recorded in a note. To end, the points are tallied and the player with the most points is declared the winner.

Pull-and-push games

Ayanga-ayanga 
One player (the "tiger") tries to leap forward and grab any of the other players (the "goats") to drag them out of the circle that they are stationed within. The last player remaining within the circle becomes the tiger in the next round of play.

Chikka 
In Chikka, also known as "tug and trip", the two teams assemble across either side of a dividing line. Each team attempts to struggle with the other such that their opponents fall onto their side of the line.

Elating Belating 
Two teams each form a line by holding hands and face each other, with each team stepping forward while saying various verses of a rhyme. Once the rhyme is completed by one team, they try to grab one of the players on the other team; victory is determined by whether the grabbing team can successfully take the opposing player away or not.

Morog Lorai 
Players must hop on one foot and attempt to knock down other players to eliminate them, with the last remaining player winning the game.

Variations of tag

Baucchi 

Baucchi (also spelled Bouchi or Boucchi) is a game where one player, the "bride", stays in an area some distance away from the "bride-snatching" team's area. The bride-snatchers can leave their area to tag players on the "bride-protecting" team and eliminate them, but the bride-snatchers must hold their breath while doing so; otherwise the bride-snatchers themselves can be tagged out by the protectors. Once the bride-snatchers have run out of breath and tagged out as many opponents as possible, the bride must run to the bride-snatchers' area without being tagged by the remaining protectors. In variations of the game, the bride may instead be considered an "old lady".

Borof Paani 
Borof Paani is the Bengali version of freeze tag.

Chhi-chhattar 
One player (the "kite") is surrounded by all other players (the "cocks"), who form a human chain by holding hands. The kite can attempt to run out of the circle of players, with the first player to chase after and tag the kite becoming the kite in the next round.

Dariabandha

Gollachut 
In Gollachut or Gollachhut, Players on the king's team start from a central location, forming a chain by holding hands, and then leave the chain, attempting to run to a certain point without being tagged out by the opponents.

Ha-du-du

Holdug 
Holdug, also known as "tag me in water", is a game where one player dives underwater and the first opponent to tag them takes their place in the next round of gameplay.

Langdi 
Langdi or Langdi tang is a game of tag where the tagger must hop on one foot, and the opponents must run within the confines of a small field.

Nuntaa

Tilo Express 
This game is similar to hide-and-seek, except that the seeker must shout out the name of each person they find (and then the word 'express') to eliminate them, with the uneliminated players able to defeat the seeker by tagging them and shouting 'tilo'.

Others
Other popular rural games include:
 Guli
 Luko-churi - equivalent to hide-and-seek.
 Lattu                              
 Kanamachi - blindfolded tag                              
 Rumal churi - similar to duck, duck, goose, but with the circling player dropping a handkerchief behind one of the opponents, who has to pick it up before chasing the first player down                              
 Pittu/Satchada/Satchara
 Kumir danga - all but one of the players stand in a designated area, and they try to leave and stay outside of that area without being tagged by the player outside of it.
 Lathie chhora - Players climb up a tree, with one of them throwing a stick away from the tree, and one of the other players required to fetch the stick and then touch the tree. Meanwhile, all of the other players climb down the tree while trying to avoid being tagged by the stick-fetcher.

See also 

 Traditional games of India
 Traditional games of Pakistan

References 

Sport in West Bengal
Sport in Bangladesh
Sport in India
Indian games
Bangladeshi games